Sedlescombe organic vineyard is an English vineyard located in Robertsbridge, just outside Sedlescombe in East Sussex.

Established in 1979, it is an all organic vineyard. It is one of the few British vineyards to produce red wine.

References

External links
Official Site

Wineries of England
1979 establishments in England
vineyard